Boa is the eponymous debut album by the Croatian and former Yugoslav rock band, Boa. It was released in 1982.

Track listing

Side A

Side B

Personnel
Mladen Puljiz: Keyboards, Synthesizers, Main Vocal
Slavko Remenaric: Acoustic and Electric Guitars, Synth Guitar, Vocals
Damir Kospic: Bass, Backing Vocals
Igor Sostaric: Acoustic and Electronic Drums, Percussion
Gunnar Bylinn: Percussion

External links 
 Boa at Discogs

1982 debut albums
Boa (Croatian band) albums
Suzy (record label) albums
Croatian-language albums